Musa arfakiana is a species of wild banana from the genus Musa (Musaceae)

Distribution and origin 
This species of wild banana was found in Indonesia, and in Papua, and in the Manokwari Regency of West Papua.

References 

Bananas
arfakiana